RVF may refer to:

 Racial Volunteer Force, a violent British neo-Nazi splinter group
 Rift Valley fever, a viral disease first reported among livestock in Rift Valley of Kenya in the early 1900s, also affecting humans
 Right ventricular failure
 La Revue du vin de France, a monthly French magazine on wine
 Rylands v Fletcher, English tort law case